Wong Kam-sing, GBS,  JP (born in 1963), is a Hong Kong architect and the former Secretary for the Environment, Wong had held a number of public service positions before joining the Government, including the first Chairman of the Environment and Sustainable Development Committee of the Hong Kong Institute of Architects, the Chairman of the Professional Green Building Council and the Vice Chairman of the Hong Kong Green Building Council. He has contributed to the promotion and research of the standards and guidelines for sustainable built environment applicable to the high-density urban environment of Hong Kong.

Policy Vision 
During his tenure as the Secretary for the Environment, Wong has introduced a number of policy blueprints to establish the direction, targets and roadmaps for policies on air quality, waste reduction and recycling, nature conservation, climate change and energy. He announced the Hong Kong Environmental Report 2012-2022 in June 2022 and used six “I” to illustrate the environmental policies and measures during the past ten years from 2012 to 2022:  	

Interaction; Innovation; Integration; 	

Improvement; Investment; Infrastructure.

As to the blueprints, they include:

 March 2013, "A Clean Air Plan for Hong Kong";
 May 2013, "Hong Kong Blueprint for Sustainable Use of Resources 2013–2022";
 February 2014, "A Food Waste & Yard Waste Plan for Hong Kong 2014–2022";
 May 2015, "Energy Saving Plan for Hong Kong’s Built Environment 2015–2025+";
 November 2015, “Hong Kong Climate Change Report 2015”;
 December 2016, "Hong Kong Biodiversity Strategy and Action Plan 2016–2021";
 January 2017, "Hong Kong’s Climate Action Plan 2030+".
 June 2017, “Clean Air Plan for Hong Kong 2013–2017 Progress Report”;
 February 2021, “Waste Blueprint for Hong Kong 2035”;
 March 2021, “Hong Kong Roadmap on Popularisation of Electric Vehicles”;
 June 2021, “Clean Air Plan for Hong Kong 2035”;
 October 2021 “Hong Kong’s Climate Action Plan 2050”.

Air Quality 
To improve the air quality, Wong implemented a new set of air quality objectives soon after his assumption of office, and launched the  Air Quality Health Index to tie in with the new objectives. From 2010 to 2020, the ambient concentrations of major air pollutants (including respirable suspended particulates, fine suspended particulates, nitrogen dioxide and sulphur dioxide) have dropped by 37% to 58%, and the roadside concentrations of such air pollutants have also dropped by 40% to 50%.

On the other hand, the Government has implemented over the years a wide range of measures targeting the major local air pollution emission sources (i.e. vehicles, vessels and power plants). Such measures include a scheme of over $10 billion implemented between 2014 and 2020 to phase out some 80 000 pre-Euro IV diesel commercial vehicles, and another $7 billion scheme launched in 2020 to phase out some 40 000 Euro IV diesel commercial vehicles by end-2027. Starting from 2015, ocean-going vessels are required to switch to low-sulphur fuel while berthing in Hong Kong, making Hong Kong the first Asian city to implement mandatory fuel switch at berth. From 2019 onwards, vessels are further required to use low-sulphur fuel within Hong Kong waters to dovetail with the establishment of the first marine emission control area in the Mainland China. The power plants have also been continuously reducing the emission of air pollutants in order to meet the emission caps set by the Government.  The percentage of coal-fired electricity generation has been substantially reduced from about 50% in 2015 to less than 25% in 2020.  Besides, the Clean Air Plan for Hong Kong 2035 published in June 2021 sets out the vision of “Healthy Living‧Low-carbon Transformation‧World Class” with clearly established long-term goals and specific policies to continuously enhance the air quality from now to 2035.

In respect of promoting the use of electric vehicles, on the percentage of electric private cars among all private cars, in 2020, 12.4% of newly registered private cars in Hong Kong were electric. This percentage is higher than that of the Mainland China(4.6%) and other Asian economies such as South Korea (2.2%), Japan (0.3%) and Thailand (0.2%).  In 2021, the percentage of newly registered electric private cars in Hong Kong further surged to 25%, representing that one out of every four new private cars was electric. In the first quarter of 2022, nearly half of the new private cars sold were EVs. In addition, the Government launched the $2 billion EV-charging at Home Subsidy Scheme (EHSS) in October 2020 to subsidise the installation of electric vehicle charging-enabling infrastructure in car parks of existing private residential buildings. To meet market demand, the Government proposed in the 2022-23 Budget and the Legislative Council (LegCo) has approved further injection of $1.5 billion to extend the EHSS for four years to the 2027-28 financial year. The Hong Kong Roadmap on Popularisation of Electric Vehicles later announced in March 2021 also sets out the vision of “Zero Carbon Emissions‧Clean Air‧Smart City”, as well as Hong Kong’s targets to cease new registration of fuel-propelled private cars in 2035 or earlier and attain zero vehicular emissions before 2050.

Waste reduction and recycling 
On waste management, the key strategies include:

a)	Introduce quantity-based waste charging through legislation in accordance with the “polluter pays” principle to encourage waste reduction at source: the Waste Disposal (Charging for Municipal Solid Waste) (Amendment) Bill 2018 was passed by the LegCo on 26 August 2021 for implementation in 2023 at the earliest.

b)	Implement producer responsibility schemes (PRS) for different products: Three pieces of legislation relating to PRS were passed between 2012 and 2017, covering plastic shopping bags, glass beverage containers, and waste electrical and electronic equipment (WEEE). In June 2022, the Government initiated the legislative process for making subsidiary legislation for enhancing the Plastic Shopping Bag Charging Scheme and full implementation of the PRS on glass beverage containers. The Government is preparing to introduce the PRS on plastic beverage containers, and has rolled out the Reverse Vending Machine (RVM) Pilot Scheme in early 2021 to test out the application of RVMs for collecting waste plastic beverage containers in Hong Kong.

c)	Encourage the public to reduce food waste at source: The Food Wise Hong Kong Campaign has been launched since 2013 to promote a “food wise and waste less” culture through the Big Waster icon and various schemes, e.g. Food Wise Charter, Food Wise Eateries Scheme, etc.;  and  have been set up to convey food waste reduction and other green messages to the public and foster interaction with supporters, especially young people; and non-governmental organisations have been funded by the Environment and Conservation Fund to promote surplus food donation, etc.

d)	Promote waste separation and recovery: Clean Recycling Campaign has been rolled out in continuation of the “blue for paper, yellow for aluminium cans, brown for plastic bottles” campaign introduced about 20 years ago; a mobile application “Waste Less” has been developed to display the location of over 7 000 recyclable collection points across the territory; the GREEN@COMMUNITY recycling network comprising Recycling Stations, Recycling Stores and Recycling Spots are set up to strengthen the recycling support facilities at district level; Green Outreach teams have been formed to strengthen on-site support for waste reduction and recycling at community level; the “GREEN$ Electronic Participation Incentive Scheme” has been launched with a smart card to encourage the public to actively participate in clean recycling; a Recycling Fund involving a total of $2 billion has been rolled out to support the recycling industry; the “Reduce and Recycling 2.0” Campaign was launched in June 2020 to step up the efforts to educate the public on making good use of the community recycling network, and to encourage them to go green and support circular economy and green recovery.

e)	Turn waste into energy: T‧PARK was fully commissioned in April 2016 to treat sludge from the sewage treatment works and generate energy; a large-scale advanced municipal solid waste incineration plant (the Integrated Waste Management Facilities Phase 1) is being constructed near Shek Kwu Chau; a network of Organic Resources Recovery Centres (O‧PARKs) is being built in phases, of which O‧PARK1 has been in operation since July 2018, while O‧PARK2 is now under construction and is targeted to be commissioned in 2023; meanwhile, trials on the innovative food waste/sewage sludge anaerobic co-digestion technology for processing food waste are being carried out at the Tai Po Sewage Treatment Works and the Sha Tin Sewage Treatment Works. Subject to the effectiveness of this technology, the Government will further expand its application to other sewage treatment works in the long run. The Integrated Waste Management Facilities Phase 1, I·PARK1, which is now being built near Shek Kwu Chau, will be the first waste-to-energy facility that adopts advanced incineration technology to treat municipal solid waste in Hong Kong. The Government also announced that it planned to develop I·PARK2 at the middle ash lagoon at Tsang Tsui in Tuen Mun and a comprehensive territory-wide site search study would be commenced to identify other potential sites suitable for developing waste-to-energy facilities, so as to implement the strategies set out in Waste Blueprint for Hong Kong 2035

f)	Turn waste into resources: WEEE‧PARK, which commenced full operation in March 2018, adopts state-of-the-art technologies for proper recycling and treatment of locally generated WEEE. To provide the general public with greater convenience in recycling, the Government set up a free recycling hotline 2676 8888. Members of the public not purchasing a new regulated electrical equipment (REE) item can also call the hotline to make an appointment for a free door-to-door collection service. As at September 2021, WEEE‧PARK has processed over 75 000 tonnes (about 2.62 million pieces) of WEEE, including about 610 000 washing machines, 330 000 refrigerators, 450 000 televisions, 270 000 air-conditioners and 960 000 computer products, so as to turn waste into resources. Y·PARK is the first large-scale yard waste recycling centre in Hong Kong. Through the processes of sorting, cutting, shredding and drying etc, Y·PARK can turn suitable yard waste into various recyclable products, such as wood boards, wood beams, wood chips and sawdust, for practical use by downstream users, including the production of biochar.

g)	Support waste paper and plastic recycling: The Government engaged a number of service contractors in July 2020 to collect waste paper across the territory for screening, sorting and exporting to other places for recycling;  a 2-year pilot scheme was launched in 2020 in three districts to provide free collection of a wide range of plastic recyclables from non-commercial and non-industrial sources in the districts, such as public and private housing estates, schools, GREEN@COMMUNITY and Community Recycling Centres. The scheme will be expanded to cover nine districts starting from 2022.

Nature conservation 
Laws were enacted by the LegCo in 2013 and 2017 to incorporate the country park enclaves of Tai Long Sai Wan (Sai Wan), Kam Shan, Yuen Tun, Fan Kei Tok, Sai Lau Kong and the site near Nam Shan into their respective country parks, thus increasing the total area of country parks by about 50 hectares. In 2016, the Environment Bureau and the Agriculture, Fisheries and Conservation Department launched the first city-level Biodiversity Strategy and Action Plan for Hong Kong to step up biodiversity conservation and support sustainable development in Hong Kong.

In June 2017, the Government announced its in-principle agreement to conserving private lands with high ecological value in Sha Lo Tung through non-in-situ land exchange.  In February 2021, the Government announced that the proposed non-in-situ land exchange would proceed for the long-term conservation of this area renowned for having marshes and streams among woodland and being a sanctuary for dragonflies.

The Government implemented the amended Protection of Endangered Species of Animals and Plants Ordinance (Cap 586) in May 2018 to enhance regulations on import and re-export of ivory and elephant hunting trophies, to progressively phase out the local ivory trade by the end of 2021, and to increase penalties on smuggling and illegal trade in endangered species to deter related activities.

The Government established the Countryside Conservation Office in July 2018 to coordinate countryside conservation projects and promote sustainable development of remote countryside. In October 2019, the Countryside Conservation Funding Scheme was launched to provide support to non-profit-making organisations and villagers in organising diverse and innovative conservation and revitalisation projects based on an interactive and co-operative approach.

In 2020, the Government amended the Wild Animals Protection Ordinance (Cap. 170), stipulating that with effect from 1 April 2021, the Sham Wan Restricted Area would extend from the beach to the adjoining waters, occupying a total area of nearly 100 hectares. At the same time, the restricted period would be extended to seven months (i.e. from 1 April to 31 October) each year, so as to strengthen the protection of the Green Turtle nesting ground on the beach at Sham Wan on Lamma Island.

In addition, the Southwest Lantau Marine Park, covering an area of about 650 hectares, has formally become the sixth marine park in Hong Kong with effect from 1 April 2020. This is conducive to protecting the habitat of the Chinese White Dolphins, Finless Porpoises and other marine species. On the other hand, with the implementation of the new fisheries management strategy in marine parks on 1 April 2020, commercial fishing will be completely banned in four marine parks (i.e. the Hoi Ha Wan Marine Park, Yan Chau Tong Marine Park, Tung Ping Chau Marine Park, and Sha Chau and Lung Kwu Chau Marine Park) after expiry of the two-year transitional period, viz. 31 March 2022. This will enhance the protection of the coral communities in marine parks, increase fisheries resources and promote the sustainable development of the fisheries industry.

The Government announced in the 2021 Budget that $500 million would be set aside to carry out enhancement works on facilities in some country parks, so as to enrich visitors’ experience and enjoyment at the countryside.

On 6 October 2021, the Government announced enhancements to the Public-Private Partnership (PPP) Scheme under the New Nature Conservation Policy. An additional option will be provided under the enhanced PPP, whereby land owners may opt to surrender the Conservation Portion to the Government for proactive conservation and management which will facilitate the preservation of more sites with ecological importance.

Climate change 
To implement the Paris Agreement, the HKSAR Government has set a target that by 2030, carbon intensity should be lower than the 2005 level by 65% to 70%. By then, the per capita carbon emissions will be reduced to 3.3 to 3.8 tonnes per year. Figures show that Hong Kong’s carbon emissions peaked in 2014. The per capita carbon emissions also decreased from 6.2 tonnes (peak) in 2014 to 5.4 tonnes in 2018, and are anticipated to decrease further to 4.5 tonnes in 2020. The Government has invited the Council for Sustainable Development to engage the public by conducting public engagement exercise to help formulate a longer-term decarbonisation strategy. Meanwhile, a $200 million Green Tech Fund has been set up in 2020 to promote local research and development on decarbonisation and green technologies. The Government has further injected $200 million to the fund in 2022.

Energy 
The Hong Kong’s Climate Action Plan 2050 announced in October 2021 put forward the decarbonisation strategy of “net-zero electricity generation”. Hong Kong will cease using coal for daily electricity generation, as well as increase the share of renewable energy (RE) in the fuel mix for electricity generation to 7.5% to 10% by 2035, and to 15% subsequently. By developing RE, trying out the use of new energy and strengthening co-operation with neighbouring regions, the Government aims to achieve the long-term target of net-zero electricity generation before 2050.

The Government has been driving the development of RE. Since 2018, it has introduced Feed-in Tariff (FiT) and a number of facilitating measures, which includes relaxing the restrictions on the installation of solar energy generation systems on the rooftops of “village houses”, exempting individuals participating in the FiT Scheme from applying for business registration and paying related profits tax, and introducing facilitation measures on installation of solar photovoltaic systems in open car parks by private sector.  The Government has also launched Solar Harvest to install solar energy generation systems for schools and welfare organisations for free. As at the first quarter of 2022, the two power companies had received over 20 000 FiT applications, of which over 90% of applications had been approved. Upon completion of installation of the systems approved, it is estimated that about 300 million kilowatt hour of electricity can be generated each year, which is sufficient to meet the electricity demand of about 90 000 households (roughly equivalent to all households in the Central and Western District).

Moreover, the Government has taken the lead in developing RE. A number of waste-to-energy projects have been commissioned progressively or are under planning. The Government is also actively developing larger-scale RE projects in suitable reservoirs, sewage treatment and flood prevention facilities, as well as restored landfills. Since 2017-18, the Government has earmarked a total of $3 billion to install small-scale RE systems at government premises. As at September 2021, about 130 projects have been approved, including installation of solar energy generation systems at government offices, government quarters, schools, recreational grounds-cum-rest gardens, reservoirs and pedestrian links, as well as installation of waste-to-energy and hydro power systems at multiple sewage treatment plants.

Another strategy of the Hong Kong’s Climate Action Plan 2050 is the promotion of “energy saving and green buildings” to reduce energy demand. The Government’s goal is to reduce the electricity consumption of commercial buildings by 30% to 40% and that of residential buildings by 20% to 30% from the 2015 level by 2050; and to achieve half of the above targets by 2035. To this end, the Government will consider expanding the scope of regulation regarding the energy efficiency standards of building services installations, requiring more frequent energy audits, and mandating the implementation of identified energy management opportunities. The Government will also strengthen the promotion of retro-commissioning. At the same time, the Government will study the feasibility of incorporating district cooling system (DCS) in more new development areas, and make full use of green innovation and technology to optimise the operation of DCSs. The Government will also keep the Mandatory Energy Efficiency Labelling Scheme under review and consider setting a minimum energy efficiency requirement for regulated appliances, etc.

In 2017, Wong launched a blog (SEN’s Blog) to brief the public on the latest progress of his policy initiatives with the help of video clips and images. In addition,  and  pages have been set up in recent years to strengthen communication with the public.

Personal experience 
After graduated from CCC Kei Tsz Primary School, Wong studied in St Bonaventure College and High School and Po Leung Kuk CFA No. 1 College (now called Po Leung Kuk No.1 W.H. Cheung College). Wong got his degree from the Faculty of Architecture of the University of Hong Kong in 1988. He then received further education on sustainable built environment from the graduate school of the University of British Columbia in Canada in the 1990s.

Family 
Wong’s wife, Susan Leung So-wan, is also an architect. Leung was the Chair of the Board of Local Affairs of the Hong Kong Institute of Architects. They have a daughter.

References 

Government officials of Hong Kong
1963 births
Living people